Jiaohe may refer to the following locations in China:

Jiaohe, Jilin (蛟河市), county-level city of Jilin City
Jiaohe ruins (交河故城), archaeological site near Turpan, Xinjiang
Jiao River (Shandong) (胶河), or Jiao He, river in Shandong
Jiaohe, Botou, Hebei (交河镇), town in Botou, Hebei

See also
 Jiahe (disambiguation)